Melghirimyces algeriensis  is a Gram-positive, halotolerant, thermotolerant and aerobic bacterium from the genus of Melghirimyces which has been isolated from the salt lake Chott Melrhir in Algeria.

References

External links
Type strain of Melghirimyces algeriensis at BacDive -  the Bacterial Diversity Metadatabase	

Bacillales
Bacteria described in 2012
Halophiles
Thermophiles